This list of Megachile species is an almost comprehensive listing of species of the bees belonging to the genus Megachile.

A

M. abacula Cresson, 1878
M. abdominalis Smith, 1853
M. abessinica Friese, 1915
M. abluta Cockerell, 1911
M. abnegatula Cockerell, 1937
M. abnormis Mitchell, 1930
M. abongana Strand, 1911
M. acanthura Cockerell, 1937
M. accraensis Friese, 1903
M. acculta Cockerell, 1931
M. acerba Mitchell, 1930
M. acris Mitchell, 1930
M. aculeata Vachal, 1910
M. acutiventris Friese, 1903
M. addenda Cresson, 1878
M. addita Pasteels, 1965
M. addubitans Cockerell, 1931
M. adelaidae Cockerell, 1910
M. adeloptera Schletterer, 1891
M. adelphodonta Cockerell, 1924
M. adempta Cockerell, 1931
M. admixta Cockerell, 1931
M. aduaensis Friese, 1909
M. adusta (King, 1994)
M. aequilibra Vachal, 1908
M. aetheria Mitchell, 1930
M. aethiops Smith, 1853
M. affabilis Mitchell, 1930
M. affinis Brullé, 1832
M. afra Pasteels, 1965
M. africanibia Strand, 1912
M. agilis Smith, 1879
M. agnosta Engel, 2017
M. agustini Cockerell, 1905
M. ainu Hirashima & Maeta, 1974
M. akamiella Pasteels, 1965
M. alamosana Mitchell, 1934
M. alani Cockerell, 1929
M. alata Mitchell, 1934
M. albicaudella Pasteels, 1965
M. albiceps Friese, 1903
M. albidula Alfken, 1931
M. albifasciata Rebmann, 1970
M. albifascies (Alfken, 1932)
M. albifrons Smith, 1853
M. albimarginalis Rebmann, 1970
M. albipila Pérez, 1895
M. albiscopa Saussure, 1890
M. albisecta (Klug, 1817)
M. albitarsis Cresson, 1872
M. albobarbata Cockerell, 1915
M. albobasalis Smith, 1879
M. albocincta Radoszkowski 1874
M. albocristata Smith, 1853
M. albohirsuta Pasteels, 1965
M. albohirta (Brullé, 1839)
M. albolineata Cameron, 1897
M. albomarginata Smith, 1879
M. albonigra Pasteels, 1973
M. albonotata Radoszkowski 1886
M. albopilosa Friese, 1916
M. alboplumula Wu, 2005
M. albopunctata Jörgensen, 1909
M. alborufa Friese, 1911
M. alborufula Cockerell, 1937
M. alboscopacea Friese, 1903
M. alleni Mitchell, 1927
M. alleynae Rayment, 1935
M. alopecura Cockerell, 1923
M. alpicola Alfken, 1924
M. alpigena Friese, 1925
M. alta Mitchell, 1930
M. altera Vachal, 1903
M. alternans Friese, 1922
M. alticola (Cameron, 1902)
M. alucaba (Snelling, 1990)
M. amabilis Cockerell, 1933
M. ambigua (Pasteels, 1965)
M. amboinensis Friese, 1909
M. amica Cresson, 1872
M. amoena (Pasteels, 1965)
M. amparo Gonzalez, 2006
M. amputata Smith, 1857
M. analis Nylander, 1852
M. anatolica Rebmann, 1968
M. angelarum Cockerell, 1902
M. angolensis (Cockerell, 1935)
M. angularis Mitchell, 1930
M. angulata Smith, 1853
M. angusta Mitchell, 1930
M. angustistrigata Alfken, 1924
M. animosa Cockerell, 1931
M. anodonta Cockerell, 1927
M. anograe Cockerell, 1908
M. anomomaculata (Pasteels, 1965)
M. anthophila Strand, 1913
M. anthracina Smith, 1853
M. antinorii Gribodo, 1879
M. antiqua Mitchell, 1930
M. antisanellae Cameron, 1903
M. apennina Benoist, 1940
M. apicalis Spinola, 1808
M. apicata Smith, 1853
M. apicipennis Schrottky, 1902
M. apoicola (Engel, 2011)
M. apora Krombein, 1953
M. apostolica Cockerell, 1937
M. apposita Rayment, 1939
M. arabica Friese, 1901
M. architecta Smith, 1857
M. arctos Vachal, 1904
M. arcuata Cockerell, 1919
M. arcus Mitchell, 1930
M. ardens Smith, 1879
M. ardua Mitchell, 1930
M. argentina Friese, 1906
M. aricensis Friese, 1904
M. aridissima Cockerell, 1937
M. armaticeps Cresson, 1869
M. armatipes Friese, 1909
M. armenia Tkalcu, 1992
M. armipygata Strand, 1911
M. armstrongi Perkins & Cheesman, 1928
M. arnaui Moure, 1948
M. arnoldiella (Pasteels, 1965)
M. arundinacea Taschenberg, 1872
M. asahinai Yasumatsu, 1955
M. asiatica Morawitz, 1875
M. assumptionis Schrottky, 1908
M. asterae Mitchell, 1943
M. astragali Mitchell, 1938
M. astridella Pasteels, 1965
M. asuncicola Strand, 1910
M. asymmetrica (Snelling, 1990)
M. atahualpa Schrottky, 1913
M. aterrima Smith, 1861
M. atlantica Benoist, 1934
M. atopognatha Cockerell, 1933
M. atrata Smith, 1853
M. atratiformis Meade-Waldo, 1914
M. atratula Rebmann, 1968
M. atrella Cockerell, 1906
M. atricoma Vachal, 1908
M. atripes Friese, 1904
M. atroalbida Pasteels, 1965
M. atrocastanea (Alfken, 1932)
M. atropyga (van der Zanden, 1995)
M. attenuata Vachal, 1910
M. aurantiaca Friese, 1905
M. aurantipennis Cockerell, 1912
M. aurata Mitchell, 1930
M. aurea Mitchell, 1930
M. aureiventris Schrottky, 1902
M. auriceps Meade-Waldo, 1914
M. auriculata (Gupta, 1989)
M. aurifacies Pasteels, 1985
M. aurifera Cockerell, 1935
M. aurifrons Smith, 1853
M. aurilabris Pasteels, 1965
M. auripubens Rebmann, 1970
M. aurivillii Friese, 1901
M. aurorea Friese, 1917
M. aurulenta (Pasteels, 1970)
M. austeni Cockerell, 1906
M. australasiae Dalla Torre, 1896
M. australis H. Lucas, 1876
M. axillaris Meade-Waldo, 1915
M. axyx (Snelling, 1990)
M. azarica Cockerell, 1945
M. azteca Cresson, 1878

B

M. babylonica Rebmann, 1970
M. badia Bingham, 1890
M. baeri Vachal, 1904
M. baetica (Gerstaecker, 1869)
M. bahamensis Mitchell, 1927
M. bakeri Cockerell, 1918
M. bangana Cockerell, 1931
M. banksi Mitchell, 1930
M. barbata Smith, 1853
M. barbatula Smith, 1879
M. barbiellinii Moure, 1944
M. barkeri Cockerell, 1920
M. barvonensis Cockerell, 1914
M. basalis Smith, 1853
M. basirubella Pasteels, 1973
M. batchelori Cockerell, 1929
M. battorensis Meade-Waldo, 1912
M. bella Mitchell, 1930
M. bellula Bingham, 1897
M. benigna Mitchell, 1930
M. bentoni Cockerell, 1919
M. bernardinensis Strand, 1910
M. bertonii Schrottky, 1909
M. beutenmulleri Cockerell, 1907
M. bhavanae Bingham, 1897
M. bicarinis Vachal, 1909
M. bicolor (Fabricius, 1781)
M. bicornis (King, 1994)
M. bicornuta Friese, 1903
M. bidentata (Fabricius, 1775)
M. bidentis Cockerell, 1896
M. biexcisa (Pasteels, 1970)
M. bigibbosa Friese, 1908
M. biloba Vachal, 1910
M. bilobata Friese, 1915
M. binghami Meade-Waldo, 1912
M. binominata Smith, 1853
M. binota Vachal, 1908
M. binotulata Dalla Torre, 1896
M. bioculata Pérez, 1902
M. bipartita Smith, 1879
M. bipunctulata (Pasteels, 1965)
M. biroi Friese, 1903
M. biseta Vachal, 1903
M. bisinua Vachal, 1908
M. bispinosa Friese, 1921
M. bituberculata Ritsema, 1880
M. blanda Mitchell, 1930
M. boharti Mitchell, 1942
M. boliviensis Friese, 1917
M. bombiformis Gerstaecker, 1857
M. bombycina Radoszkowski 1874
M. bomplandensis Durante, 1996
M. botanicarum Cockerell, 1923
M. botucatuna Schrottky, 1913
M. bougainvillei Cockerell, 1911
M. brachysoma Cockerell, 1924
M. bradleyi Mitchell, 1934
M. brasiliensis Dalla Torre, 1896
M. bredoi Cockerell, 1935
M. brethesi Schrottky, 1909
M. breviata Vachal, 1908
M. breviceps Friese, 1898
M. brevis Say, 1837
M. breviuscula Smith, 1879
M. bridarollii Moure, 1947
M. brimleyi Mitchell, 1926
M. brochidens Vachal, 1903
M. brooksi Pauly, 2001
M. browni Mitchell, 1934
M. bruchi Schrottky, 1909
M. bruneri Mitchell, 1934
M. bruneriella Cockerell, 1917
M. brunissima (Pasteels, 1965)
M. bucephala (Fabricius, 1793)
M. buchwaldi Mitchell, 1943
M. buddhae Dalla Torre, 1896
M. buehleri Schrottky, 1909
M. bukamensis Cockerell, 1935
M. bullata Friese, 1911
M. burdigalensis Benoist, 1940
M. burmeisteri Friese, 1908
M. burungana Cockerell, 1931
M. butonensis Friese, 1909
M. butteli Friese, 1918
M. buxtoni Perkins & Cheesman, 1928

C

M. caldwelli Cockerell, 1911
M. calida Smith, 1879
M. callura (Cockerell, 1914)
M. campanulae (Robertson, 1903)
M. canariensis Pérez, 1902
M. canastra Melo & Parizotto, 2015
M. candanga Raw, 2006
M. candentula Cockerell, 1915
M. candida Smith, 1879
M. canescens (Brullé, 1832)
M. canifrons Smith, 1853
M. capitata Smith, 1853
M. captionis Cockerell, 1914
M. carbonaria Smith, 1853
M. caricina Cockerell, 1907
M. carinata Radoszkowski 1893
M. carinifrons Alfken, 1926
M. cartagenensis Mitchell, 1930
M. carteri Cockerell, 1929
M. casadae Cockerell, 1898
M. castaneipes Friese, 1908
M. catamarcensis Schrottky, 1908
M. catulus (Cockerell, 1910)
M. centuncularis (Linnaeus, 1758)
M. cephalotes Smith, 1853
M. ceratops Engel, 2017
M. cestifera Benoist, 1954
M. cetera Cockerell, 1912
M. ceylonica Bingham, 1896
M. chamacoco Schrottky, 1913
M. chapini (Cockerell, 1935)
M. cheesmanae (Michener, 1965)
M. chelostomoides Gribodo, 1894
M. chiangmaiensis Chatthanabun & Warrit, 2020
M. chichimeca Cresson, 1878
M. chilensis Spinola, 1851
M. chilopsidis Cockerell, 1900
M. chinensis Radoszkowski 1874
M. chlorura Cockerell, 1918
M. chomskyi Sheffield, 2013
M. chrysognatha Cockerell, 1943
M. chrysophila Cockerell, 1896
M. chrysopogon Vachal, 1910
M. chrysopyga Smith, 1853
M. chrysopygopsis Cockerell, 1929
M. chrysorrhoea Gerstaecker, 1857
M. chyzeri Friese, 1909
M. ciliatipes Cockerell, 1921
M. cincta (Fabricius, 1781)
M. cinctiventris Friese, 1916
M. cincturata Cockerell, 1912
M. cinerea Friese, 1905
M. cingulata Friese, 1903
M. cinnamomea Alfken, 1935
M. circumcincta (Kirby, 1802)
M. clara Mitchell, 1930
M. clariceps Friese, 1917
M. cleomis Cockerell, 1900
M. cliffordi Rayment, 1953
M. clio Friese, 1903
M. clotho Smith, 1861
M. clypeata Smith, 1853
M. clypeosinuata Pasteels, 1985
M. cochisiana Mitchell, 1934
M. cockerelli Rohwer, 1923
M. coelioxoides Cresson, 1878
M. cognata Smith, 1853
M. cognatiforme (Pasteels, 1970)
M. collaris Friese, 1908
M. colombiana Mitchell, 1930
M. coloradensis Mitchell, 1936
M. colorata Fox, 1896
M. comata Cresson, 1872
M. combinata (Pasteels, 1965)
M. commixta (Pasteels, 1970)
M. communis Morawitz, 1875
M. compacta Smith, 1879
M. compta Vachal, 1908
M. conaminis Cockerell, 1926
M. concava Mitchell, 1930
M. concinna Smith, 1879
M. concolor Friese, 1903
M. conferta Mitchell, 1930
M. congruata Mitchell, 1943
M. congruens Friese, 1903
M. coniformis Friese, 1922
M. conjugalis Mitchell, 1930
M. conjuncta Smith, 1853
M. conjunctiformis Yasumatsu, 1938
M. conradsi Friese, 1911
M. constructrix Smith, 1879
M. contempta Mitchell, 1930
M. continua Mitchell, 1930
M. coquilletti Cockerell, 1915
M. coquimbensis Ruiz, 1938
M. cordata Smith, 1879
M. cordovensis Mitchell, 1930
M. corduvensis Schrottky, 1909
M. cornigera Friese, 1904
M. corsica Benoist, 1935
M. costaricensis Friese, 1917
M. crabipedes Wu, 2005
M. cradockensis Friese, 1909
M. crandalli Mitchell, 1957
M. crassepunctata Yasumatsu & Hirashima, 1965
M. crassipes Smith, 1879
M. crassitarsis Cockerell, 1931
M. crassula Pérez, 1896
M. crenulata Fox, 1896
M. cressa (Tkalcu, 1988)
M. creusa Bingham, 1898
M. creutzburgi (Tkalcu, 2009)
M. croceipennis Friese, 1917
M. crotalariae (Schwimmer, 1980)
M. cruziana Mitchell, 1930
M. ctenophora Holmberg, 1886
M. cubiceps Friese, 1906
M. cupreohirta Cockerell, 1933
M. curta Cresson, 1865
M. curtilipes Vachal, 1909
M. curtula Gerstaecker, 1857
M. curtuloides Pasteels, 1973
M. curvipes Smith, 1853
M. cyanescens Friese, 1904
M. cyanipennis Guérin-Méneville, 1845
M. cygnorum Cockerell, 1906
M. cylindrica Friese, 1906
M. cypricola Mavromoustakis, 1938

D

M. dacica Mocsáry, 1879
M. dakotensis Mitchell, 1926
M. dalmeidai Moure, 1944
M. dampieri Cockerell, 1907
M. danunciae Melo & Parizotto, 2015
M. dariensis Pasteels, 1965
M. darwiniana Cockerell, 1906
M. davaonensis Cockerell, 1918
M. davidsoni Cockerell, 1902
M. davisi Mitchell, 1930
M. dawensis (Pasteels, 1965)
M. deanii Rayment, 1935
M. decemsignata Radoszkowski 1881
M. deceptoria Pérez, 1890
M. deceptrix Smith, 1879
M. deflexa Cresson, 1878
M. delectus Mitchell, 1930
M. delphinensis Benoist, 1962
M. demeter Cockerell, 1937
M. densa Mitchell, 1930
M. dentitarsus Sladen, 1919
M. derasa Gerstaecker, 1869
M. derelicta Cockerell, 1913
M. derelictula Cockerell, 1937
M. desertorum Morawitz, 1875
M. detersa Cockerell, 1910
M. devadatta Cockerell, 1907
M. devexa Vachal, 1903
M. diabolica Friese, 1898
M. diamontana Melo & Parizotto, 2015
M. diasi Raw, 2006
M. difficilis Morawitz, 1875
M. digiticauda Cockerell, 1937
M. digna Mitchell, 1930
M. diligens Smith, 1879
M. dimidiata Smith, 1853
M. dinognatha Cockerell, 1929
M. dinura Cockerell, 1911
M. diodontura Cockerell, 1922
M. discolor Smith, 1853
M. discorhina Cockerell, 1924
M. discriminata Rebmann, 1968
M. disjuncta (Fabricius, 1781)
M. disjunctiformis Cockerell, 1911
M. disputabilis Krombein, 1951
M. distinguenda Ruiz, 1941
M. diversa Mitchell, 1930
M. doanei Cockerell, 1908
M. doddiana Cockerell, 1906
M. dohrandti Morawitz, 1880
M. doleschalli Cockerell, 1907
M. dolichognatha Cockerell, 1931
M. dolichosoma Benoist, 1962
M. dolichotricha Cockerell, 1927
M. donata Mitchell, 1930
M. donbakeri (Gonzalez and Engel, 2012)
M. dorsalis Pérez, 1879
M. dorsata Smith, 1853
M. droegei Sheffield & Genaro, 2013
M. duala Strand, 1914
M. dubiosa Friese, 1909
M. duboulaii (Smith, 1865)
M. dulciana Mitchell, 1934
M. dupla Ritsema, 1880
M. durantae Gonzalez, Griswold & Engel, 2018

E

M. ebenea (King, 1994)
M. eburnipes Vachal, 1904
M. ecplectica (Snelling, 1990)
M. ecuadoria Friese, 1904
M. edentata Friese, 1925
M. edwardsi Friese, 1922
M. edwardsiana Friese, 1925
M. electrum Mitchell, 1930
M. elizabethae Bingham, 1897
M. elongata Smith, 1879
M. emexae (King, 1994)
M. empeyi (Pasteels, 1970)
M. enceliae Cockerell, 1926
M. epixanthula Cockerell, 1931
M. ericetorum Lepeletier, 1841
M. erimae Mocsáry, 1899
M. erythropyga Smith, 1853
M. erythrura (Pasteels, 1970)
M. esakii Yasumatsu, 1935
M. esora Cameron, 1903
M. esseniensis (Pasteels, 1979)
M. estebana Cockerell, 1924
M. eucalypti Cockerell, 1910
M. eulaliae Cockerell, 1917
M. eupyrrha Cockerell, 1937
M. eurimera Smith, 1854
M. eurycephala Wu, 2005
M. euzona Pérez, 1899
M. exaltata Smith, 1853
M. excavata Cockerell, 1937
M. exilis Cresson, 1872
M. eximia Friese, 1903
M. expleta Mitchell, 1930
M. exsecta Pasteels, 1965

F

M. fabricator Smith, 1868
M. faceta Bingham, 1897
M. facetula Cockerell, 1918
M. facialis Vachal, 1908
M. falcidentata Moure & Silveira, 1992
M. familiaris Cockerell, 1916
M. fasciatella Friese, 1905
M. fastidiosa Mitchell, 1930
M. fastigiata Vachal, 1910
M. feijeni Schulten, 1977
M. felicis Mitchell, 1930
M. felina Gerstaecker, 1857
M. ferox Smith, 1879
M. ferruginea Friese, 1903
M. ferruginea (King & Exley, 1985) (Homonym)
M. ferruginosa Mitchell, 1930
M. fertoni Pérez, 1896
M. fervida Smith, 1853
M. fidelis Cresson, 1878
M. fiebrigi Schrottky, 1908
M. filicornis Friese, 1908
M. fimbriata Smith, 1853
M. fimbriventris Friese, 1911
M. finschi Friese, 1911
M. flabellipes Pérez, 1895
M. flammiventris Vachal, 1908
M. flavicrinis Vachal, 1908
M. flavidula Rebmann, 1970
M. flavihirsuta Mitchell, 1930
M. flavipennis Smith, 1853
M. flavipes Spinola, 1838
M. flavofasciata Wu, 1982
M. fletcheri Cockerell, 1919
M. florensis Mitchell, 1943
M. foersteri Gerstaecker, 1869
M. foliata Smith, 1861
M. forbesii Cockerell, 1937
M. formosa (Pasteels, 1970)
M. fortis Cresson, 1872
M. framea Schrottky, 1913
M. franki (Friese, 1920)
M. frankieana Raw, 2006
M. fraterna Smith, 1853
M. friesei Schrottky, 1902
M. frigida Smith, 1853
M. frontalis (Fabricius, 1804)
M. frugalis Cresson, 1872
M. fruticosa Mitchell, 1930
M. fucata Mitchell, 1934
M. fuerteventurae (Tkalcu, 1993)
M. fuliginosa Friese, 1925
M. fullawayi Cockerell, 1914
M. fultoni Cockerell, 1913
M. fulva Smith, 1853
M. fulvescens Smith, 1853
M. fulvifrons Smith, 1858
M. fulvimana Eversmann, 1852
M. fulvipennis Smith, 1879
M. fulvitarsis Friese, 1909
M. fulvofasciata Radoszkowski 1882
M. fulvohirta Friese, 1904
M. fulvomarginata Cockerell, 1906
M. fumata Mitchell, 1930
M. fumipennis Smith, 1868
M. funebris Radoszkowski 1874
M. funeraria Smith, 1863
M. funnelli Cockerell, 1907
M. furcata Vachal, 1909
M. fusca Friese, 1903
M. fuscicauda Cockerell, 1933
M. fuscitarsis Cockerell, 1912
M. futilis Mitchell, 1930

G

M. gahani Cockerell, 1906
M. galactogagates Gribodo, 1894
M. gambiensis Cockerell, 1937
M. garambana Pasteels, 1965
M. garleppi Friese, 1904
M. gastracantha Cockerell, 1931
M. gathela Cameron, 1908
M. gemula Cresson, 1878
M. genalis Morawitz, 1880
M. geneana (Gribodo, 1894)
M. gentilis Cresson, 1872
M. geoffrei Cockerell, 1920
M. georgica Cresson, 1878
M. gessi Eardley, 2012
M. gessorum Eardley, 2012
M. ghillianii Spinola, 1843
M. gibbidens Vachal, 1910
M. gibboclypearis Pasteels, 1979
M. gibbsi (Gonzalez and Engel, 2012)
M. gigantea Friese, 1911
M. gigas Schrottky, 1908
M. gigas Wu, 2005 (Homonym)
M. gilbertiella Cockerell, 1910
M. giliae Cockerell, 1906
M. giraudi Gerstaecker, 1869
M. globiceps (Pasteels, 1970)
M. gobabebensis Eardley, 2013
M. godeffroyi Friese, 1911
M. goegabensis Eardley, 2013
M. gomphrenae Holmberg, 1886
M. gomphrenoides Vachal, 1908
M. gordoni Cockerell, 1937
M. gothalauniensis Pérez, 1902
M. gowdeyi Cockerell, 1931
M. gracilis Schrottky, 1902
M. grandibarbis Pérez, 1899
M. gravita Mitchell, 1934
M. grisea (Fabricius, 1794)
M. griseola Cockerell, 1931
M. griseopicta Radoszkowski 1882
M. grisescens Morawitz, 1875
M. guaranitica Schrottky, 1908
M. guayaqui Schrottky, 1913
M. guineae Strand, 1912

H

M. habilis Mitchell, 1930
M. habropodoides Meade-Waldo, 1912
M. hackeri Cockerell, 1913
M. haematogastra Cockerell, 1921
M. haematoxylonae Mitchell, 1930
M. hamata Mitchell, 1930
M. hamatipes Cockerell, 1923
M. hampsoni Cockerell, 1906
M. hardyi Cockerell, 1929
M. harrarensis Friese, 1915
M. haryanaensis Rahman & Chopra, 1994
M. haryanensis Sharma, Simlote & Gupta, 1993
M. hecate Vachal, 1903
M. hei Wu, 2005
M. heinii Kohl, 1906
M. heinrichi (Tkalcu, 1979)
M. heliophila Cockerell, 1913
M. hemirhodura Cockerell, 1937
M. henrici Cockerell, 1907
M. hera Bingham, 1897
M. heriadiformis Smith, 1853
M. hertlei Friese, 1911
M. heteroptera Sichel, 1867
M. heterotrichia Cameron, 1909
M. hieronymi Friese, 1906
M. hilata Mitchell, 1934
M. hilli Cockerell, 1929
M. hirsuta Morawitz, 1893
M. hirsutula Pasteels, 1973
M. hirticauda Cockerell, 1937
M. hisarensis Rahman & Chopra, 1994
M. hisarica Engel, 2017
M. hoffmanseggiae Jörgensen, 1912
M. hohmanni Tkalcu, 1993
M. holmbergi Jörgensen, 1912
M. holomelaena Cockerell, 1917
M. holorhodura (Cockerell, 1933)
M. holosericea (Fabricius, 1793)
M. holostoma Cockerell, 1937
M. hookeri Cockerell, 1915
M. horatii Cockerell, 1913
M. horrida Schulten, 1977
M. huascari Cockerell, 1912
M. hubeiensis Wu, 2005
M. humilis Smith, 1879
M. hungarica Mocsáry, 1877
M. hypoleuca Cockerell, 1927
M. hypopyrrha Cockerell, 1937

I

M. ianthoptera Smith, 1853
M. ichnusae Rebmann, 1968
M. ignava Mitchell, 1930
M. ignescens Cockerell, 1929
M. igniscopata Cockerell, 1911
M. ignita Smith, 1853
M. iheringi Schrottky, 1913
M. ikuthaensis Friese, 1903
M. illustris Mitchell, 1930
M. imitata Smith, 1853
M. immanis Mitchell, 1930
M. impartita Mitchell, 1934
M. imperialis Friese, 1903
M. impressa Friese, 1903
M. impudens Mitchell, 1930
M. incana Friese, 1898
M. incerta Radoszkowski 1876
M. incisa Smith, 1858
M. indica (Gupta, 1988)
M. indica (Gupta, 1990) (Homonym)
M. indigoferae Mitchell, 1930
M. indonesica (Engel and Schwarz, 2011)
M. inermis Provancher, 1888
M. inexpectata Pasteels, 1973
M. inexspectata Rebmann, 1968
M. infima Vachal, 1908
M. infinita Mitchell, 1930
M. inflaticauda Cockerell, 1939
M. ingens Friese, 1903
M. ingenua Cresson, 1878
M. inimica Cresson, 1872
M. innupta Cockerell, 1915
M. inquirenda Schrottky, 1913
M. inscita Mitchell, 1930
M. insignis van der Zanden, 1996
M. insolens Mitchell, 1930
M. insolita (Pasteels, 1965)
M. instita Mitchell, 1934
M. insularis Smith, 1859
M. integra Cresson, 1878
M. integrella Mitchell, 1926
M. intermixta Gerstaecker, 1869
M. invenita (Pasteels, 1965)
M. inyoensis Mitchell, 1942
M. iranica Rebmann, 1970
M. irritans Smith, 1879
M. itapuae Schrottky, 1908
M. ituriana Cockerell, 1935
M. ituriella Pasteels, 1965
M. ivonensis Cockerell, 1927
M. izucara Cresson, 1878

J-K

M. jakesi Tkalcu, 1988
M. jamaicae (Raw, 1984)
M. janthopteriana Strand, 1911
M. japonibia Strand, 1910
M. japonica Alfken, 1903
M. jeanneli Benoist, 1934
M. jenseni Friese, 1906
M. jerryrozeni Genaro, 2003
M. joergenseni Friese, 1908
M. johannis Friese, 1922
M. joseana Friese, 1917
M. judaea Tkalcu, 1999
M. junodi Friese, 1904
M. kakadui (King, 1994)
M. kalina Gonzalez, Griswold & Engel, 2018
M. kamerunensis Friese, 1922
M. kandyca Friese, 1918
M. karatauensis (Tkalcu, 1988)
M. karooensis (Brauns, 1912)
M. kartaboensis Mitchell, 1930
M. kashmirensis (Tkalcu, 1988)
M. kasiana (Pasteels, 1965)
M. katonana Strand, 1911
M. kelnerae Pasteels, 1978
M. khamana Cockerell, 1938
M. kigonserana Friese, 1903
M. kimilolana Cockerell, 1931
M. kirbiella Rayment, 1935
M. kirbyana Cockerell, 1906
M. kobensis Cockerell, 1918
M. kohtaoensis Cockerell, 1927
M. kommai Nagase, 2017
M. konowiana Friese, 1903
M. kruegeri Friese, 1923
M. kuehni Friese, 1903
M. kununurrensis (King, 1994)
M. kurandensis Cockerell, 1910
M. kuschei Cockerell, 1939
M. kyotensis Alfken, 1931

L

M. labascens Cockerell, 1925
M. laboriosa Smith, 1862
M. ladacensis Cockerell, 1911
M. ladakhensis (Tkalcu, 1988)
M. laeta Smith, 1853
M. laevinasis Vachal, 1904
M. lagopoda (Linnaeus, 1761)
M. laguniana Mitchell, 1937
M. laminata Friese, 1903
M. laminopeds Wu, 2005
M. lamnula Vachal, 1908
M. lanata (Fabricius, 1775)
M. lanigera Alfken, 1933
M. lapponica Thomson, 1872
M. larochei Tkalcu, 1994
M. latericauda Cockerell, 1921
M. lateritia Smith, 1858
M. laticeps Smith, 1853
M. laticincta Cockerell, 1936
M. latimanus Say, 1823
M. latita Mitchell, 1934
M. lativentris Friese, 1903
M. latula Vachal, 1908
M. laurita Mitchell, 1927
M. leachella Curtis, 1828
M. leeuwinensis Meade-Waldo, 1915
M. lefebvrei (Lepeletier, 1841)
M. lefroma Cameron, 1907
M. legalis Cresson, 1879
M. lenticula Vachal, 1908
M. lentifera Vachal, 1909
M. leonum Cockerell, 1930
M. lerma Cameron, 1908
M. leucografa Friese, 1908
M. leucomalla Gerstaecker, 1869
M. leucopogon Cockerell, 1929
M. leucopogonata (Dours, 1873)
M. leucopogonites Moure, 1944
M. leucopsis Schletterer, 1891
M. leucopyga Smith, 1853
M. leucospila Cockerell, 1933
M. leucostomella Cockerell, 1927
M. levilimba Vachal, 1908
M. ligniseca (Kirby, 1802)
M. limata Vachal, 1908
M. lineatipes Cockerell, 1910
M. lineatula Cockerell, 1937
M. lineofasciata (Pasteels, 1965)
M. lingulata Vachal, 1908
M. lippiae Cockerell, 1900
M. lobatifrons Cockerell, 1924
M. lobicauda Cockerell, 1931
M. lobitarsis Smith, 1879
M. longiceps Meade-Waldo, 1915
M. longuisetosa Gonzalez & Griswold, 2007
M. lorentzi Friese, 1911
M. lorenziensis Mitchell, 1930
M. louisae Brauns, 1926
M. luangwae Meade-Waldo, 1913
M. lucidifrons Ferton, 1905
M. lucidiventris Smith, 1853
M. luctifera Spinola, 1841
M. luederwaldti Schrottky, 1913
M. luteiceps Friese, 1911
M. luteicornis Pasteels, 1973
M. luteipes Friese, 1908
M. luteoalba Pasteels, 1973
M. luteociliata Pasteels, 1965
M. luteohirta Pasteels, 1973
M. lutescens Cockerell, 1931

M

M. maackii Radoszkowski 1874
M. mabirensis Cockerell, 1937
M. mackayensis Cockerell, 1910
M. macleayi Cockerell, 1907
M. macneilli Mitchell, 1957
M. maculariformis Cockerell, 1907
M. macularis Dalla Torre, 1896
M. maculata Smith, 1853
M. maculosella Pasteels, 1965
M. magadiensis Cockerell, 1937
M. malangensis Friese, 1904
M. malayana Cameron, 1901
M. malimbana Strand, 1911
M. manaosensis Schrottky, 1913
M. manchuriana Yasumatsu, 1939
M. mandibularis Morawitz, 1875
M. manguna Strand, 1911
M. manicata Giraud, 1861
M. manifesta Cresson, 1878
M. manni Mitchell, 1934
M. manyara Eardley & R. P. Urban, 2006
M. marginata Smith, 1853
M. marina Friese, 1911
M. maritima (Kirby, 1802)
M. marshalli Friese, 1904
M. mastrucatella Strand, 1911
M. matsumurai Hirashima & Maeta, 1974
M. maurata Mitchell, 1936
M. mauritaniae (Tkalcu, 1992)
M. mavromoustakisi van der Zanden, 1992
M. maxillosa Guérin-Méneville, 1845
M. mcnamarae Cockerell, 1929
M. meadewaldoi Brauns, 1912
M. mediana (Pasteels, 1965)
M. mediorufa Cockerell, 1930
M. mefistofelica Gribodo, 1894
M. megachiloides (Alfken, 1942)
M. melancholica Jörgensen, 1912
M. melanderi Mitchell, 1944
M. melanogaster Eversmann, 1852
M. melanophaea Smith, 1853
M. melanops Cockerell, 1937
M. melanopyga Costa, 1863
M. melanota Pérez, 1895
M. melanotricha Spinola, 1851
M. mellitarsis Cresson, 1878
M. memecylonae (Engel, 2011)
M. mendanae Cockerell, 1911
M. mendica Cresson, 1878
M. mendocensis Durante, Abramovich & Lucia, 2006
M. mendozana Cockerell, 1907
M. meneliki Friese, 1915
M. merrilli Cockerell, 1918
M. mertoni Friese, 1903
M. meruensis Friese, 1909
M. metallescens Cockerell, 1918
M. michaelis Cockerell, 1931
M. micheneri Mitchell, 1936
M. micrerythrura Cockerell, 1910
M. microdontura Cockerell, 1927
M. microsoma Cockerell, 1912
M. mimetica Cockerell, 1933
M. mimeticana Eardley & R. P. Urban, 2006
M. minima Ashmead, 1900
M. minor Vachal, 1908
M. minutissima Radoszkowski 1876
M. minutula Friese, 1911
M. minutuloides Alfken, 1936
M. miranda Vachal, 1904
M. mitchelli Raw, 2004
M. mixtura Eardley & R. P. Urban, 2005
M. mlanjensis Meade-Waldo, 1913
M. mlunguziensis Schulten, 1977
M. mobilis Mitchell, 1930
M. moderata Smith, 1879
M. modesta Smith, 1862
M. moelleri Bingham, 1897
M. moera Cameron, 1902
M. mojavensis Mitchell, 1934
M. mongoliae (Tkalcu, 1988)
M. mongolica Morawitz, 1890
M. monkmani Rayment, 1935
M. monstrifica Morawitz, 1878
M. monstrosa Smith, 1868
M. montenegrensis Dours, 1873
M. montezuma Cresson, 1878
M. montibia Strand, 1911
M. monticola Smith, 1853
M. montivaga Cresson, 1878
M. montonii Gribodo, 1894
M. morawitzi Radoszkowski 1886
M. morio Smith, 1853
M. morsitans Saussure, 1890
M. mortyana Dalla Torre, 1896
M. mossambica Gribodo, 1895
M. moureana Silveira et al., 2002
M. muansae Friese, 1911
M. mucida Cresson, 1878
M. mucorea Friese, 1898
M. mucorosa Cockerell, 1908
M. multidens Fox, 1891
M. multispinosa Morawitz, 1875
M. mundifica Cockerell, 1921
M. murina Friese, 1913
M. musculus Friese, 1913
M. mutala Strand, 1912
M. mystacea (Fabricius, 1775)
M. mystaceana (Michener, 1962)

N

M. naevia Kohl, 1906
M. namibensis Eardley, 2012
M. nana Bingham, 1897
M. nasalis Smith, 1879
M. nasica Morawitz, 1880
M. nasicornis Friese, 1903
M. nasidens Friese, 1898
M. natansiella Cockerell, 1944
M. navicularis Cockerell, 1918
M. neavei Vachal, 1910
M. nelsoni Mitchell, 1936
M. nematocera Cockerell, 1929
M. neoxanthoptera Cockerell, 1933
M. neutra Vachal, 1908
M. nevadensis Cresson, 1879
M. newberryae Cockerell, 1900
M. nidulator Smith, 1864
M. nigella Vachal, 1908
M. nigeriensis Cockerell, 1937
M. nigra Schulten, 1977
M. nigribarbis Vachal, 1909
M. nigricans Cameron, 1898
M. nigriceps Friese, 1903
M. nigrimanus Schulten, 1977
M. nigripennis Spinola, 1841
M. nigripes Spinola, 1838
M. nigripollex Vachal, 1910
M. nigrita Radoszkowski 1876
M. nigriventris Schenck, 1870
M. nigroalba Friese, 1920
M. nigroapicalis Wu, 2005
M. nigroaurea Pasteels, 1965
M. nigrocaudata Friese, 1903
M. nigrofulva Hedicke, 1940
M. nigrohirta Friese, 1903
M. nigromixta Cockerell, 1919
M. nigropectoralis Wu, 2005
M. nigropilosa Schrottky, 1902
M. nigrorufa Pasteels, 1973
M. nigroscopula Wu, 1982
M. nigrovittata Cockerell, 1906
M. nipponica Cockerell, 1914
M. nitidiscutata Friese, 1920
M. nivalis Friese, 1903
M. niveicauda Cockerell, 1931
M. niveofasciata Friese, 1904
M. nivescens W. F. Kirby, 1900
M. nudiventris Smith, 1853
M. numerus Mitchell, 1930

O

M. obdurata Mitchell, 1930
M. obliqua Mitchell, 1930
M. oblita Vachal, 1908
M. oblonga Smith, 1879
M. obrepta Cockerell, 1925
M. obscurior Jörgensen, 1912
M. obtusa Smith, 1853
M. occidentalis Fox, 1894
M. ocellifera Cockerell, 1918
M. octosignata Nylander, 1852
M. oculiformis Rayment, 1956
M. odontophora (Engel, 2011)
M. odontostoma Cockerell, 1924
M. oenotherae (Mitchell, 1924)
M. okinawana Yasumatsu & Hirashima, 1964
M. opacifrons Pérez, 1897
M. opaculina Cockerell, 1937
M. opifex Smith, 1879
M. opposita Smith, 1853
M. orba Schrottky, 1913
M. orbiculata Mitchell, 1930
M. orcina Vachal, 1908
M. ordinaria Smith, 1853
M. orientalis Morawitz, 1895
M. ornata Smith, 1853
M. ornaticoxis Cockerell, 1935
M. ornithica Cockerell, 1937
M. orthostoma Cockerell, 1925
M. osea Cameron, 1902
M. oslari Mitchell, 1934
M. othona Cameron, 1901
M. otomita Cresson, 1878

P

M. pachyceps Friese, 1922
M. pagosiana Mitchell, 1934
M. paisa Gonzalez, Griswold & Engel, 2018
M. palaestina (Tkalcu, 1988)
M. palaonica Cockerell, 1939
M. pallida Radoszkowski, 1881
M. pallipes Smith, 1879
M. pallorea Vachal, 1903
M. palmensis Mitchell, 1934
M. palmeri Cresson, 1878
M. pamirensis Cockerell, 1911
M. pampeana Vachal, 1908
M. pamperella Vachal, 1908
M. panda Cockerell, 1931
M. pankus Bzdyk, 2012
M. papuae (Michener, 1965)
M. papuana Cockerell, 1929
M. parabukamensis (Pasteels, 1965)
M. paracallida Rayment, 1935
M. paracantha (Pasteels, 1965)
M. paraensis Mocsáry, 1887
M. parallela Smith, 1853
M. parancinnula Cockerell, 1937
M. pararhodura Cockerell, 1910
M. parata Mitchell, 1930
M. paratasmanica Rayment, 1955
M. paraxanthura Cockerell, 1914
M. parietina (Geoffroy, 1785)
M. parksi Mitchell, 1936
M. parornata Chatthanabun, Warrit & Ascher, 2020
M. parsonsiae Schrottky, 1913
M. pascoensis Mitchell, 1934
M. pasteelsi (van der Zanden, 1998)
M. patagonica Vachal, 1904
M. patellimana Spinola, 1838
M. patera (King, 1994)
M. paucipunctulata W. F. Kirby, 1900
M. pauliani Benoist, 1950
M. paulista (Schrottky, 1920)
M. paulistana Schrottky, 1902
M. paupera Pasteels, 1965
M. peculifera Cockerell, 1919
M. pedalis Fox, 1891
M. penetrata Smith, 1879
M. perezi Mocsáry, 1887
M. pereziana Dalla Torre, 1896
M. perfimbriata Cockerell, 1931
M. perihirta Cockerell, 1898
M. permunda Cockerell, 1912
M. perniciosa Friese, 1903
M. perochracea Cockerell, 1913
M. perplexa Smith, 1853
M. perpunctata Cockerell, 1896
M. persimilis Cockerell, 1937
M. perspicua Mitchell, 1930
M. peruviana Smith, 1879
M. petulans Cresson, 1878
M. pexa Rebmann, 1968
M. phaola Cameron, 1907
M. phaseoli Moure, 1977
M. phenacopyga Cockerell, 1910
M. philinca Cockerell, 1912
M. philippinensis Friese, 1916
M. phillipensis Rayment, 1935
M. picicaudata Raw, 2007
M. picicornis Morawitz, 1853
M. pictiventris Smith, 1879
M. piliceps Saussure, 1890
M. pilicrus Morawitz, 1877
M. pilidens Alfken, 1924
M. piliventris Morawitz, 1886
M. pillaultae Pasteels, 1978
M. pilosa Smith, 1879
M. pilosella Friese, 1922
M. pinguicula Pasteels, 1965
M. pinguiventris Pasteels, 1965
M. pipunctulata (Pasteels, 1965)
M. piurensis Cockerell, 1911
M. placida Smith, 1862
M. planula Vachal, 1908
M. platystoma Pasteels, 1965
M. plesiosoma (Cockerell, 1935)
M. pleuralis Vachal, 1908
M. plumata Wu, 2005
M. pluto Smith, 1860
M. poeyi Guérin-Méneville, 1845
M. policaris Say, 1831
M. pollinosa Spinola, 1851
M. polychroma Cockerell, 1937
M. pontica (Alfken, 1933)
M. portalis Cockerell, 1913
M. portlandiana Rayment, 1953
M. postnigra Cockerell, 1937
M. povolnyi (Tkalcu, 1969)
M. praecipua Mitchell, 1930
M. praefica Gribodo, 1894
M. praetexta Vachal, 1910
M. preissi Cockerell, 1910
M. pretiosa Friese, 1909
M. privigna Rebmann, 1968
M. propinqua Cockerell, 1913
M. prosopidis Cockerell, 1900
M. prudens Mitchell, 1930
M. pruina Smith, 1853
M. pruinosa Pérez, 1897
M. psenopogoniaea Moure, 1948
M. pseudanthidioides Moure, 1943
M. pseudobrevis Mitchell, 1936[1]
M. pseudocincta (Pasteels, 1970)
M. pseudofulva (Pasteels, 1965)
M. pseudolaminata (Pasteels, 1965)
M. pseudolegalis Mitchell, 1957
M. pseudomonticola Hedicke, 1925
M. pseudonigra Mitchell, 1927
M. pseudopleuralis Schrottky, 1913
M. pseudotaraxis Eardley, 2012
M. pugillatoria Costa, 1863
M. pugnata Say, 1837
M. pulchra Smith, 1879
M. pulchrifrons Cockerell, 1933
M. pulchriventris Cockerell, 1923
M. pullata Smith, 1879
M. pulvinata Vachal, 1910
M. punctata Smith, 1853
M. punctatissima Spinola, 1806
M. puncticollis Friese, 1903
M. punctolineata Cockerell, 1934
M. punctomarginata Schulten, 1977
M. pusilla Pérez, 1884
M. pyrenaea Pérez, 1890
M. pyrenaica Lepeletier, 1841
M. pyrrhogastra Cockerell, 1913
M. pyrrhothorax Schletterer, 1891
M. pyrrotricha Cockerell, 1913

Q

M. quadrata Vachal, 1909
M. quadraticauda (Pasteels, 1965)
M. quadridentata Mitchell, 1930
M. quadrispinosella Strand, 1910
M. quartinae Gribodo, 1884
M. quinquelineata Cockerell, 1906

R

M. ramakrishnae Cockerell, 1919
M. rambutwan Cheesman, 1936
M. ramera Cockerell, 1918
M. ramulipes Cockerell, 1913
M. rancaguensis Friese, 1905
M. rangii Cheesman, 1936
M. rava Vachal, 1908
M. rawi Engel, 1999
M. recisa Cockerell, 1913
M. recta Mitchell, 1930
M. rectipalma Vachal, 1909
M. redondensis Mitchell, 1930
M. reepeni Friese, 1918
M. reflexa (Snelling, 1990)
M. regina Friese, 1903
M. reicherti Brauns, 1929
M. relata Smith, 1879
M. relativa Cresson, 1878
M. relicta Cockerell, 1913
M. remeata Cockerell, 1913
M. remigata Vachal, 1908
M. remota Smith, 1879
M. remotissima Cockerell, 1926
M. remotula Cockerell, 1910
M. resinifera Meade-Waldo, 1915
M. revicta Cockerell, 1913
M. rhinoceros Mocsáry, 1892
M. rhododendri Cockerell, 1927
M. rhodogastra Cockerell, 1910
M. rhodopus Cockerell, 1896
M. rhodosiaca Rebmann, 1972
M. rhodura Cockerell, 1906
M. rhyssalus Wu, 2005
M. richtersveldensis Eardley, 2012
M. riggenbachiana Strand, 1911
M. riojana Schrottky, 1920
M. riojanensis Mitchell, 1930
M. riomii (Pasteels, 1970)
M. rixator Cockerell, 1911
M. riyadhensis (Alqarni, Hannan, Gonzalez, and Engel, 2012)
M. roepkei Friese, 1914
M. roeweri (Alfken, 1927)
M. rosarum Cockerell, 1931
M. rossi Mitchell, 1943
M. rottnestensis Rayment, 1934
M. rotundata (Fabricius, 1793)
M. rotundiceps Smith, 1857
M. rotundipennis W. F. Kirby, 1900
M. rotundiventris Perris, 1852
M. rowlandi Cockerell, 1930
M. rubi Mitchell, 1924
M. rubicunda Smith, 1879
M. rubricata Smith, 1853
M. rubricrus Moure, 1948
M. rubrigena (Pasteels, 1965)
M. rubrimana Morawitz, 1893
M. rubripes Morawitz, 1875
M. rubriventris Smith, 1879
M. rubtzovi Cockerell, 1928
M. ruda (Pasteels, 1965)
M. rufa Friese, 1903
M. rufescens Pérez, 1879
M. ruficeps Friese, 1903
M. ruficheloides Strand, 1911
M. ruficornis Smith, 1853
M. rufigaster Cockerell, 1945
M. rufipennis (Fabricius, 1793)
M. rufipes (Fabricius, 1781)
M. rufiplantis Vachal, 1904
M. rufiscopa Saussure, 1890
M. rufitarsis (Lepeletier, 1841)
M. rufiventris Guérin-Méneville, 1834
M. rufobarbata Cockerell, 1936
M. rufocaudata Friese, 1903
M. rufofulva Cockerell, 1918
M. rufohirtula Cockerell, 1937
M. rufolobata Cockerell, 1913
M. rufomaculata Rayment, 1935
M. rufopilosa Friese, 1911
M. rufoscopacaea Friese, 1903
M. rufovittata Cockerell, 1911
M. rugicollis Friese, 1903
M. rugifrons (Smith, 1854)
M. rugosa Smith, 1879
M. rupshuensis Cockerell, 1911

S

M. saba Strand, 1914
M. sabinensis Mitchell, 1934
M. saganeitana Gribodo, 1894
M. saigonensis Cockerell, 1920
M. salsburyana Friese, 1922
M. sandacana Cockerell, 1919
M. santacrucensis Durante, Abramovich & Lucia, 2006
M. santaerosae Strand, 1910
M. santaremensis Mitchell, 1930
M. santiaguensis Durante, 1996
M. sarahae Eardley, 2012
M. saulcyi Guérin-Méneville, 1845
M. saussurei Radoszkowski 1874
M. sauteri Hedicke, 1940
M. scheviakovi Cockerell, 1928
M. schmidti Friese, 1917
M. schmiedeknechti Costa, 1884
M. schulthessi Friese, 1903
M. schwimmeri Engel, 2017
M. scindularia Buysson, 1903
M. sculpturalis Smith, 1853
M. scutellata Smith, 1879
M. seducta Mitchell, 1934
M. sedula Smith, 1879
M. seewaldi Strand, 1911
M. sefrensis Benoist, 1943
M. sejuncta Cockerell, 1927
M. selenostoma Cockerell, 1931
M. semibarbata Cockerell, 1937
M. semicandens Cockerell, 1910
M. semicircularis van der Zanden, 1996
M. semiclara Cockerell, 1929
M. semicognata Cockerell, 1937
M. semierma Vachal, 1903
M. semilaurita Mitchell, 1927
M. semiluctuosa Smith, 1853
M. semipleta Cockerell, 1921
M. semirufa Sichel, 1867
M. semivestita (Smith, 1853)
M. semota Cockerell, 1927
M. senex Smith, 1853
M. septentrionella Pasteels, 1965
M. sequior Cockerell, 1910
M. seraxensis Radoszkowski 1893
M. sericans Fonscolombe, 1852
M. sericeicauda Cockerell, 1910
M. serraticauda Cockerell, 1938
M. serricauda Cockerell, 1910
M. serrigera Cockerell, 1937
M. setosa Vachal, 1909
M. sexmaculata Smith, 1868
M. seychellensis Cameron, 1907
M. sheppardi (Pasteels, 1965)
M. shortlandi Cockerell, 1911
M. siamensis Cockerell, 1927
M. sicheli Friese, 1903
M. sicula (Rossi, 1792)
M. sidalceae Cockerell, 1897
M. sikkimi Radoszkowski 1882
M. sikorae Friese, 1900
M. silvapis Wu, 2005
M. silverlocki Meade-Waldo, 1913
M. silvestris Rayment, 1951
M. similis Smith, 1879
M. simillima Smith, 1853
M. simlaensis Cameron, 1909
M. simonyi Friese, 1903
M. simplex Smith, 1853
M. simpliciformis Cockerell, 1918
M. simplicipes Friese, 1921
M. simulator Cockerell, 1937
M. sinensis (Wu, 1985)
M. singularis Cresson, 1865
M. sinuata Friese, 1903
M. slevini Cockerell, 1924
M. soledadensis Cockerell, 1900
M. sonorana Cockerell, 1924
M. sosia (Pasteels, 1970)
M. soutpansbergensis Eardley, 2012
M. speluncarum Meade-Waldo, 1915
M. sphenapis Wu, 2005
M. spinosiventris Pasteels, 1965
M. spinotulata Mitchell, 1934
M. spissula Cockerell, 1911
M. squalens Haliday, 1836
M. squamosa Rebmann, 1970
M. staudingeri Friese, 1905
M. stefenellii Friese, 1903
M. steinbachi Friese, 1906
M. stenodesma Schrottky, 1913
M. sterilis Mitchell, 1930
M. sternintegra (Pasteels, 1965)
M. stilbonotaspis Moure, 1945
M. stirostoma Cameron, 1913
M. stoddardensis Mitchell, 1957
M. stolzmanni Radoszkowski 1893
M. stomatura Cockerell, 1917
M. strandi (Popov, 1936)
M. strangei (Gonzalez & Engel, 2012)
M. strenua Smith, 1879
M. striatella Rebmann, 1968
M. striatula (Cockerell, 1931)
M. strigata Vachal, 1904
M. structilis Cockerell, 1918
M. strupigera Cockerell, 1922
M. stulta Bingham, 1897
M. subalbuta Yasumatsu, 1936
M. subanograe Mitchell, 1934
M. subatrella Rayment, 1939
M. subcingulata Moure, 1945
M. subexilis Cockerell, 1908
M. subferox Meade-Waldo, 1915
M. sublaurita Mitchell, 1927
M. submetallica Benoist, 1955
M. submucida Alfken, 1926
M. subnigra Cresson, 1879
M. subpallens Vachal, 1908
M. subparallela Mitchell, 1944
M. subremotula Rayment, 1934
M. subrixator Cockerell, 1915
M. subsericeicauda Rayment, 1939
M. subserricauda Rayment, 1935
M. subtranquilla Yasumatsu, 1938
M. sudanica Magretti, 1898
M. suffusipennis Cockerell, 1906
M. sumatrana Friese, 1918
M. sumichrasti Cresson, 1878
M. sumizome Hirashima & Maeta, 1974
M. suspecta Vachal, 1909
M. susurrans Haliday, 1836
M. swarbrecki Rayment, 1946
M. syraensis Radoszkowski 1874
M. szentivanyi (Michener, 1965)

T

M. tabayensis Schrottky, 1920
M. taftanica Engel, 2017
M. taiwanicola Yasumatsu & Hirashima, 1965
M. takaoensis Cockerell, 1911
M. tamilensis (Gupta, 1991)
M. tangensis Cockerell, 1937
M. tantilla Cockerell, 1937
M. tapytensis Mitchell, 1929
M. taraxis Eardley, 2012
M. tarea Cameron, 1902
M. tarsatula Cockerell, 1915
M. tarsatulata Cockerell, 1916
M. tasmanica Cockerell, 1916
M. taua Strand, 1911
M. tecta Radoszkowski 1888
M. temora Cameron, 1905
M. tenorai (Tkalcu, 1969)
M. tenuicincta Cockerell, 1929
M. tenuitarsis Schrottky, 1920
M. tepaneca Cresson, 1878
M. terminalis Smith, 1858
M. terminata Morawitz, 1875
M. terrestris Schrottky, 1902
M. tertia Dalla Torre, 1896
M. tessmanni Pasteels, 1965
M. tetracantha Cockerell, 1937
M. tetrazona Friese, 1908
M. tetrodonta Pasteels, 1965
M. texana Cresson, 1878
M. texensis Mitchell, 1956
M. thoracica Smith, 1853
M. thygaterella Schrottky, 1913
M. tiburonensis Cockerell, 1924
M. timberlakei Cockerell, 1920
M. timida Mitchell, 1930
M. timorensis Friese, 1918
M. tkalcui van der Zanden, 1996
M. toluca Cresson, 1878
M. tomentosa Friese, 1903
M. torrida Smith, 1853
M. toscata Mitchell, 1934
M. tosticauda Cockerell, 1912
M. townsendiana Cockerell, 1898
M. toxopei Alfken, 1926
M. tranquilla Cockerell, 1911
M. transgrediens Rebmann, 1970
M. transiens (Pasteels, 1965)
M. trapezicauda Pasteels, 1965
M. trepida Mitchell, 1930
M. tributa Vachal, 1909
M. trichorhytisma Engel, 2006
M. trichroma Friese, 1922
M. trichrootricha Moure, 1953
M. tricolor (Pasteels, 1970)
M. tridentata Ashmead, 1900
M. trigonaspis Schrottky, 1913
M. trisecta (Pasteels, 1976)
M. tritacantha (Pasteels, 1970)
M. trizonata Wu, 2005
M. trochantina Vachal, 1909
M. troodica Mavromoustakis, 1953
M. trucis Mitchell, 1930
M. truncata Friese, 1903
M. truncaticauda Cockerell, 1933
M. truncaticeps Friese, 1909
M. trusanica (Engel, 2011)
M. tsimbazazae (Pauly, 2001)
M. tsingtauensis Strand, 1915
M. tsurugensis Cockerell, 1924
M. tuberculata Smith, 1857
M. tuberculifera Schrottky, 1913
M. tuberculosa Dalla Torre, 1896
M. tucumana Vachal, 1908
M. tulariana Mitchell, 1937
M. tupinaquina Schrottky, 1913
M. turbulenta Mitchell, 1930
M. turneri (Meade-Waldo, 1913)
M. turpis Mitchell, 1930
M. tutuilae Perkins & Cheesman, 1928

U-V

M. uamiella Pasteels, 1965
M. ulrica Nurse, 1901
M. umatillensis (Mitchell, 1927)
M. umbripennis Smith, 1853
M. una Vachal, 1909
M. uncinata Gonzalez, Griswold & Engel 2018
M. ungulata Smith, 1853
M. unifasciata Radoszkowski 1881
M. urbana Smith, 1879
M. ustulata Smith, 1862
M. utra Vachal, 1903
M. vachali (Pasteels, 1965)
M. vagata Vachal, 1908
M. valdezi Cockerell, 1916
M. valida Smith, 1879
M. vandeveldii (Meunier, 1888)
M. vanduzeei Cockerell, 1924
M. variabilis (King, 1994)
M. varipes Vachal, 1908
M. variplantis Vachal, 1909
M. variscopa Pérez, 1895
M. variscopula Cockerell, 1931
M. velutina Smith, 1853
M. ventralis Smith, 1860
M. venusta Smith, 1853
M. veraecrucis Cockerell, 1896
M. verrucosa Brèthes, 1910
M. versicolor Smith, 1844
M. vestis Mitchell, 1930
M. vestita Smith, 1853
M. vestitor Cockerell, 1910
M. veterna Vachal, 1908
M. vetula Vachal, 1904
M. viator Mitchell, 1930
M. victoriana Mitchell, 1934
M. vigilans Smith, 1878
M. villipes Morawitz, 1875
M. villosa (Fabricius, 1775)
M. virescens Cockerell, 1912
M. viridicollis Morawitz, 1875
M. viridinitens Cockerell, 1930
M. vitraci Pérez, 1884
M. voiensis Cockerell, 1937
M. vulpina Friese, 1913
M. vulpinella Pasteels, 1973

W-Z

M. wagenknechti Ruiz, 1936
M. wahlbergi Friese, 1901
M. walkeri Dalla Torre, 1896
M. waterhousei Cockerell, 1906
M. wfkirbyi Kohl, 1906
M. wheeleri Mitchell, 1927
M. whiteana Cameron, 1905
M. willowmorensis Brauns, 1926
M. willughbiella (Kirby, 1802)
M. wilmattae Cockerell, 1924
M. woodfordi Cockerell, 1911
M. wyndhamensis Rayment, 1935
M. wyomingensis Mitchell, 1934
M. xanthothrix Yasumatsu & Hirashima, 1964
M. xanthura Spinola, 1853
M. xerophila Cockerell, 1933
M. xylocopoides Smith, 1853
M. yaeyamaensis Yasumatsu & Hirashima, 1964
M. yasumatsui Hirashima, 1974
M. ypiranguensis Schrottky, 1913
M. yumensis Mitchell, 1944
M. zambesica Pasteels, 1965 (Homonym)
M. zapoteca Cresson, 1878
M. zaptlana Cresson, 1878
M. zebrella Pasteels, 1973
M. zernyi Alfken, 1933
M. zexmeniae Cockerell, 1912
M. zingowli Cheesman, 1936
M. zombae Schulten, 1977
M. zygia Cameron, 1902

References

Sources
 ITIS, Megachile

Megachile